Tedd is a given name. It is often a re-spelling of "Ted" which, in turn, is a traditional nickname for people named Theodore or Edward.
 
Those bearing the given name include:
 Tedd (1904–1991), American editorial cartoonist Theodor Geisel (later author/illustrator a.k.a. Dr. Seuss)
 Tedd Pierce (1906–1972), cartoon writer, animator and artist
 Tedd Arnold (born 1949), children's book writer
 Tedd Williams (born 1969), mixed martial arts fighter
 Tedd Josiah (born 1970), Kenyan music producer
 Tedd T (fl. 2000s), producer, programmer and engineer